Coptotomus longulus is a species of predaceous diving beetle in the family Dytiscidae. It is found in North America.

Subspecies
These two subspecies belong to the species Coptotomus longulus:
 Coptotomus longulus lenticus Hilsenhoff, 1980
 Coptotomus longulus longulus LeConte, 1852

References

Further reading

 
 

Dytiscidae
Articles created by Qbugbot
Beetles described in 1852